Ghastly Beyond Belief is a book by Neil Gaiman and Kim Newman published in 1985. Ghastly Beyond Belief is a book of science fiction and fantasy quotations.

Reception
Dave Langford reviewed Ghastly Beyond Belief for White Dwarf #66, and stated that "Thrill to golden prose which spatters your enraptured forebrain across the ceiling!"

Colin Greenland reviewed Ghastly Beyond Belief for Imagine magazine, and stated that "a compendium of the weird, the unspeakable, and the crashingly inept, plundered from the forty-two corners of SF and fantasy fiction and film".

Reviews
Review by Neil Barron (1985) in Fantasy Review, June 1985
Review by Terry Broome (1985) in Vector 126
Review by Don D'Ammassa (1985) in Science Fiction Chronicle, #73 October 1985

References

Science fiction books